William Paul "Bill" Sommers (July 22, 1933January 7, 2007) was an engineer and business executive of several companies, including Booz Allen Hamilton, Iameter, and SRI International.

Education
Sommers was born in Detroit in 1933. He held a Bachelor of Science, a Master of Science in Engineering, and a Ph.D. in engineering and aeronautical engineering, all from the University of Michigan. Sommers donated a significant amount to his alma mater.

Career
Sommers worked at Booz Allen Hamilton for 29 years. He was then executive vice president of Iameter, a health care cost containment company. From 1993 to 1998, he was the CEO of SRI International. While at SRI International, he focused on cost cutting to bring the organization back to profitability.

References

2007 deaths
SRI International people
Booz Allen Hamilton people
University of Michigan College of Engineering alumni
1933 births